Brancati is a surname. Notable people with the surname include:

 Chiara Brancati (born 1981), Italian water polo player
 Francesco Brancati (1607–1671), Italian Jesuit missionary
 Francesco Lorenzo Brancati di Lauria (1612–1693), Italian cardinal
 Paula Brancati (born 1989), Canadian actress
 Vitaliano Brancati (1907–1954), Italian writer